Same-sex marriage in Brazil has been legal since 16 May 2013 in accordance with a decision from the National Justice Council, ordering notaries of every state to perform same-sex marriages. Brazil became the second country in South America to legalize same-sex marriage nationwide, after Argentina, and the twelfth worldwide to do so.

Same-sex unions had already been legally recognized in Brazil in the form of stable unions since 5 May 2011 in line with a ruling from the Supreme Federal Court. These unions are granted most of the rights of marriages, including adoption, welfare benefits, pension, inheritance tax, income tax, social security, health benefits, immigration, joint property ownership, hospital and prison visitation, IVF and surrogacy.
This decision paved the way for future legalization on same-sex matrimonial rights. Before the nationwide legalisation in May 2013, the states of Alagoas, Bahia, Ceará, Espírito Santo, Mato Grosso do Sul, Paraíba, Paraná, Piauí, Rondônia, Santa Catarina, São Paulo, and Sergipe, as well as the Federal District and the city of Santa Rita do Sapucaí, had already legalized same-sex marriages and several stable unions were converted into marriages by state judges. In Rio de Janeiro, same-sex couples could also marry but only if local judges agreed with their request.

On 14 May 2013, the National Justice Council legalized same-sex marriage in the entire country in a 14–1 vote, issuing a ruling ordering notaries nationwide to perform same-sex marriages and convert any existing stable union into a marriage if the couple so wishes. Joaquim Barbosa, president of the Supreme Federal Court, said that notaries cannot continue to refuse to "perform a civil wedding or the conversion of a stable civil union into a marriage between people of the same sex". The ruling was published on 15 May and took effect on 16 May 2013.

Stable unions

The first case of recognition of a same-sex union in Brazil occurred with a dual Brazilian-English couple in 2004. Their relationship was recognized in the form of a common-law marriage, which until then, was only granted to opposite-sex couples. The couple had lived together for fourteen years in the city of Curitiba.

In 2010, the Ministry of Foreign Affairs authorized Brazilian diplomats to request a diplomatic or service passport and stay visa for same-sex partners. The decision, which includes same-sex and opposite-sex partners, was announced internally to embassies and consulates in over 200 countries. According to the Foreign Ministry, the measure must ensure that employees register their same-sex partners to secure their right to stay outside the country. Now, with the grant of diplomatic passports, it is easier for the partner to obtain a residence permit. Also in 2010, the state-owned Infraero (Brazilian Company of Airport Infrastructure) began recognizing stable unions between same-sex couples for the purposes of granting benefits. To receive the benefits, the union must be registered with a public notary.

Stable unions have been recognized in Brazil since 5 May 2011, when the Supreme Federal Court ruled in ADI 4277 and ADPF 132 that civil unions must be allowed for same-sex couples throughout the country. The decision was approved 10–0; one judge abstained because he had previously spoken publicly in favor of same-sex unions when he was attorney general. The ruling resulted in stable unions for same-sex couples having the same financial and social rights enjoyed by those in heterosexual relationships. Civil unions of same-sex couples are guaranteed the same 112 rights as marriages of opposite-sex couples. The ruling came in response to two lawsuits, one filed by the Rio de Janeiro State Government in 2008 and another in 2009 by the Public Prosecutor's Office. Same-sex couples can officially register their relationships as a stable union by proving that they have a shared bank account or live at the same address, etc.

On 17 June 2011, a judge in Goiânia, Jeronymo Pedro Villas Boas, annulled the stable union of Liorcino Mendes and Odilio Torres, and ordered all notaries in Goiânia to stop issuing civil union licenses. Villas Boas, who is also a church pastor of the Assembleia de Deus, claimed that recognizing same-sex unions was unconstitutional. On 21 June, another judge, Beatriz Figueiredo Franco, cancelled Villas Boas' decision, making the union valid again. Concerned, Liorcino Mendes and Odilio Torres registered another civil union in Rio de Janeiro.

On 7 June 2013, the Brazilian Air Force recognized the stable union of a sergeant and his partner after he presented a notarized deed documenting their relationship. The Air Force did not comment on the recognition, and could not confirm if the relationship was the first same-sex union certified by the branch. On 8 August 2013, Judge Elio Siqueira of the Regional Federal Court of the 5th region ruled on appeal that the Brazilian Army must recognize the stable union (performed in January 2012 in Pernambuco) of a service member and his same-sex partner, and must also accord a military spousal pension to the partner. It marked the first time that a state-recognized same-sex union was recognized by the Army.

Same-sex marriage

Marriage in Brazil is governed by federal law rather than state law and involves the issuing of a marriage license by a notary. In May 2011, the Supreme Federal Court ruled that the present law allowed for same-sex couples to formalize their relationship in the form of a stable union. Using this decision as precedent, many states amended their directives for issuing marriage certificates to allow same-sex marriages and require notaries who preside over marriage licenses and perform marriages to provide such services to same-sex couples.

National Justice Council ruling
On 14 May 2013, the National Justice Council ruling in a 14–1 vote that notaries must perform same-sex marriages and convert existing stable unions into marriages if the couples so desire. Joaquim Barbosa, president of the Supreme Federal Court, said in the decision that notaries cannot continue to refuse to "perform a civil wedding or the conversion of a stable civil union into a marriage between persons of the same sex." The ruling took effect on 16 May 2013.

On 21 May 2013, the Social Christian Party (PSC) lodged an appeal against the National Justice Council's decision with the Supreme Federal Court. The party alleged that the council had committed an abuse of power, arguing that legalising same-sex marriage was a matter exclusively for the National Congress to decide. The appeal did not result in a stay of the council's decision in favour of same-sex marriage. On 30 May 2013, the Supreme Federal Court rejected the appeal on technical grounds, stating that the PSC had used the wrong form of appeal. The court held that the National Justice Council's decision could only be challenged through a "direct action for unconstitutionality" (ação direta de inconstitucionalidade) rather than an action for injunction (mandado de segurança). On 6 June 2013, the PSC re-lodged the appeal. On 28 August 2013, the Procuradoria Geral da República (Attorney General), as well as the Cabinet of Brazil under President Dilma Rousseff, forwarded an opinion in favor of same-sex marriage to the Supreme Court. Given that the National Justice Council ruling was issued by the council's president, who was also the Chief Justice of the Supreme Federal Court, it is unlikely the latter court would ever overturn the council's ruling. As of 2022, the appeal lodged by the PSC had not yet received oral arguments in court.

Proposals in the National Congress
A Brazilian legislative commission for human rights recommended in October 2013 a measure that would ensure that religious bodies would not be required to solemnize same-sex marriages. The proposal would allow a religious body to decline to officiate at marriages of those "who violate its values, doctrines, and beliefs". The proposal was to have been brought forward in Brazil's National Congress if it was approved by a constitutional committee, though no such action was taken prior to the 2014 elections.

In March 2017, the Constitution and Justice Commission of the Brazilian Senate preliminary approved a bill to reflect the National Justice Council ruling, by modifying the Civil Code to recognize stable unions between two persons of the same sex and enable the conversion of that union into marriage. The proposal would replace the definition of the family entity from the "stable union between man and woman" to the "stable union between two people", and insert a provision stating that marriage can be performed between two people, thus replacing the article restricting it to opposite-sex couples. On 3 May, the commission gave its final approval to the bill. The bill needed to be approved by the Senate and the Chamber of Deputies before becoming law, but it was not advanced by either legislative chamber prior to the 2018 elections.

Timeline prior to 2013 ruling

Individual cases
In several individual cases, marriage licenses were granted, often through the decision of a judge. Notable cases include:
On 27 June 2011, a judge in the state of São Paulo converted a same-sex civil union into a marriage. The couple held a wedding ceremony the following day. 
 On 28 June 2011, another stable union between a same-sex couple was converted into a marriage. Judge Jennifer Antunes de Souza from the 4th Family Court of Brasília upheld the order.
On 31 May 2012, a civil partnership contracted by two men in England was converted into a marriage when the couple moved to Brazil.
On 29 May 2012, four of the six notaries of Porto Alegre, the capital city of Rio Grande do Sul, agreed to convert civil unions into marriages.
On 28 June 2012, 28 same-sex couples got married in a ceremony in Belém, Pará.

Statewide

The 2011 Supreme Court decision gave rise to several states explicitly altering their marriage procedures, enabling same-sex couples to marry in a manner that is bureaucratically identical to opposite-sex couples. Those states are listed below:

On 7 December 2011, the Corregedoria Geral da Justiça of Alagoas ordered the state civil registry to issue marriage licences to same-sex couples, making Alagoas the first Brazilian state to legalize same-sex marriages. The decision took effect on 6 January 2012.
On 5 July 2012, the Corregedoria Geral da Justiça of Sergipe issued "Provision nº 06/2012" legalizing same-sex marriage in the state.
On 11 July 2012, following the decision of a judge, Santa Rita do Sapucaí, Minas Gerais became the only city in the country to allow same-sex marriages by itself.
On 15 August 2012, the Corregedoria Geral da Justiça of the state of Espírito Santo issued a circular letter stating that the civil registry of the state must address same-sex marriages the same way as opposite-sex marriages, making it the third Brazilian state to legalize same-sex marriage.
On 26 November 2012, the Corregedoria Geral da Justiça of Bahia adapted its directive regulating marriages to include same-sex marriages in a manner equal to different-sex couples.
On 1 December 2012, a court in the Federal District, ruled that, effective immediately, marriage licenses should be granted to same-sex couples without a judge's intervention.
On 15 December 2012, the Corregedoria Geral da Justiça of Piauí updated its marriage provisions in a similar manner.
On 18 December 2012, the Corregedoria Geral da Justiça of São Paulo did the same, with an entry into effect 60 days later (i.e. 16 February 2013).
On 7 March 2013, Judge Francisco Sales Neto from the Corregedoria Geral da Justiça of Ceará ruled in "Provision N. 02/2013" that all notaries statewide are required to license same-sex marriages. The decision took effect on 15 March 2013.
On 26 March 2013, the Corregedoria Geral da Justiça of Paraná ruled that same-sex marriages and conversion of stable unions into marriages is possible using the normal marriage procedures.
On 2 April 2013, the Corregedoria Geral da Justiça of Mato Grosso do Sul authorized marriages between same-sex couples in the state.
On 17 April 2013, Judge Valmir de Oliveira Silva of the Justice Tribunal of Rio de Janeiro published a legal ruling authorizing same-sex marriages in the state if local judges agreed. According to the ruling, a couple's request had to be registered by civil registry officers, who had 15 days to decide if they agreed. If they did not agree, the marriage could not proceed.
On 26 April 2013, the Corregedoria Geral da Justiça of the state of Rondônia published "Provision N. 008/2013-CG" which provides for marriages between same-sex couples and conversion of stable unions into marriages in the civil registration records of the state.
On 29 April 2013, the Corregedoria Geral da Justiça of the state of Santa Catarina legalized same-sex marriages in the state.
On 29 April 2013, Judge Murilo Márcio da Cunha Ramos from the Corregedoria Geral da Justiça of Paraíba published "Provision CGJ N. 006/2013" which legalized same-sex marriages in the state.

The Corregedoria Geral de Justiça is the administrative department of the state judicial power. It issues administrative rules for the everyday operation of courts and notaries in their respective states.

Marriage statistics
In 2018, 9,520 same-sex couples married in Brazil; 59.7% of these marriages were performed in the Southeast Region, 15.1% in the Northeast Region, 14.4% in the South Region, 7.4% in the Central-West Region and 3.4% in the North Region. 4,100 same-sex marriages were performed in São Paulo, 737 in Minas Gerais, 723 in Rio de Janeiro, 480 in Rio Grande do Sul, 458 in Paraná, 429 in Santa Catarina, 391 in Pernambuco, 330 in Ceará, 288 in Bahia, 274 in the Federal District, 218 in Goiás, 201 in Pará, 166 in Mato Grosso do Sul, 129 in Espírito Santo, 114 in Rio Grande do Norte, 105 in Paraíba, 95 in Alagoas, 49 in Amazonas, 46 in Mato Grosso, 45 in Piauí, 43 in Sergipe, 26 in Maranhão, 24 in Rondônia, 18 in Acre, 18 in Tocantins, 8 in Amapá and 5 in Roraima.

2018 saw a significant rise in marriages, particularly in the later months of the year, with November seeing a 68% rise compared to 2017.

Figures for 2020 are lower than previous years because of the restrictions in place due to the COVID-19 pandemic.

Religious performance
In June 2018, the Anglican Episcopal Church of Brazil officially changed its canons to permit same-sex marriages. The move was supported by 57 synod members, while 3 voted against. The church joined other Anglican provinces, including the American, Scottish and Canadian branches of the Anglican Communion, in performing same-sex marriages in its churches.

Several same-sex marriages have also been conducted in Umbanda or Candomblé ceremonies. An Umbanda priestess in Rio de Janeiro said in 2011 that, "In umbanda this is accepted. It's fine. … We carry out marriages of love."

Two-spirit marriages
Several indigenous peoples in Brazil recognize marriages between members of the same biological sex through a two-spirit status. These two-spirit individuals are born male but typically wear women's clothing and perform everyday household work and artistic handiwork which are regarded as belonging to the feminine sphere. They wear women's clothing, take care of the family, and marry men. This two-spirit status thus allows for marriages between two biological males to be performed among the Kadiwéu. They marry warrior men. One tibira, the Tibira do Maranhão, was executed in 1614 by the French on charges of sodomy. The Tupinambá also recognize two-spirit people who are born female but perform men's activities such as hunting. They marry women and adopt similar roles as men in the home. Similar individuals occupying a third gender role are also found among the Ticuna, the Karajá and the Krahô.

Public opinion
According to a Pew Research Center survey conducted between 4 November 2013 and 14 February 2014, 45% of Brazilians supported same-sex marriage and 48% were opposed.

A September–October 2016 survey by the Varkey Foundation found that 59% of 18–21-year-olds supported same-sex marriage in Brazil.

According to the Brazilian Institute of Public Opinion and Statistics, support for same-sex couples having the same rights as different-sex couples in Brazil in 2017 was 49%, with 38% opposing. Support was higher among women, young people, people with higher educational levels and Brazilians living in the South region of the country.

The 2017 AmericasBarometer showed that 52% of Brazilians supported same-sex marriage. A May 2021 Ipsos poll showed that 55% of Brazilians supported same-sex marriage, 14% favored another form of legal recognition, while 18% were opposed to all legal recognition for same-sex couples, and 13% were undecided.

See also

 LGBT rights in Brazil
 ADI 4277 and ADPF 132
 Rcl 12876 and MS 32077
 Recognition of same-sex unions in the Americas
 Brazilian Institute of Family Law

References

 
2013 in LGBT history